Thomson (SS-20) is a Type 209 submarine, 1400-l variant and referred to as the Thomson class. The boat was  built for the Chilean Navy by Howaldtswerke-Deutsche Werft  shipyards in Kiel, Germany. The boats namesake is Manuel Thomson Porto Mariño, who died as commander of the Huáscar, during the blockade of Arica in the War of the Pacific.

Thomson is homeported in Talcahuano. A systems modernisation was carried out between 2007 and 2009.

She has one sister ship in Chilean service .

References

1982 ships
Submarines of the Chilean Navy
Thomson-class submarines of the Chilean Navy